Abdulqadir Hassan Mohamed (born 15 April 1962) is an Emirati footballer. He played as a goalkeeper for the UAE national football team as well as Al-Shabab Club in Dubai.

Hassan was a member of the UAE squad at the 1990 FIFA World Cup finals. However, he did not play in any matches.

References

1962 births
Living people
Emirati footballers
1984 AFC Asian Cup players
1990 FIFA World Cup players
1992 AFC Asian Cup players
United Arab Emirates international footballers
UAE Pro League players
Al Shabab Al Arabi Club Dubai players
Association football goalkeepers